Sind University railway station is  located in  Pakistan. This railway station is also known as Jamshoro railway station. It is located at the side of Indus Highway and opposite to University of Sindh. The station serves as a stop of passenger trains i.e. Bolan Mail and Khushhal Khan Khattak Express.

See also
 List of railway stations in Pakistan
 Pakistan Railways
 Ministry of Railways

References

External links

Railway stations in Jamshoro District
Railway stations on Kotri–Attock Railway Line (ML 2)